KDVC (98.3 FM; "The Dove") is a radio station serving the Columbia, Missouri area. It broadcasts a fully-automated soft adult contemporary format with no DJs. The station is owned by Iris Media, with Zimmer Radio Group operating and managing KDVC through a local marketing agreement.

History
From its launch on November 9, 2016, KDVC played commercial-free Christmas music as "K-Santa".  At 12:01am December 26 KDVC played "Faith" by George Michael (who had died the day before) as the official sign on of "98.3 the Dove". The station continues to play all-Christmas music in November and December of each year. 

KDVC revived the 98.3 frequency in Columbia, which between 1971 and 2001 was occupied by KFMZ, a rock station. Its license was canceled in 2001 after a years-long revocation battle triggered when station owner Mike Rice was convicted of sexual misconduct with underage boys. After Rice's appeals on his criminal conviction and with the FCC were exhausted, KFMZ and all of its sister stations left the air on October 4, 2001. The 98.3 frequency returned to the air in 2015 as a translator for the K-Love contemporary Christian network. To make way for the launch of KDVC, K-Love relocated to a former Zimmer Radio-held translator spot at 106.5 in September 2016.

References

External links
KDVC website

DVC (FM)
Soft adult contemporary radio stations in the United States
Radio stations established in 2016
2016 establishments in Missouri